Vairao, also Port Vairao and Matiti, is a small port town and district on the southwest coast of Tahiti, just to the northwest of Teahupo'o.
A town hall and sports centres lie in the northern part of the village and also features the Iti Diving International Centre, the only diving centre in Tahiti-Iti. Vairao Bay and lagoon is noted for its fishing.

References

Towns and villages in Tahiti